Firsovka is a rural locality (a khutor) in Nizhnegnutovskoye Rural Settlement, Chernyshkovsky District, Volgograd Oblast, Russia. The population was 142 as of 2010. There are 2 streets.

Geography 
Firsovka is located on the right bank of the Tsimla River, 41 km south of Chernyshkovsky (the district's administrative centre) by road. Sizov is the nearest rural locality.

References 

Rural localities in Chernyshkovsky District